

The Holcopogoninae are a subfamily of moths. They belong to the huge the superfamily Gelechioidea, of which they represent a minor but apparently quite distinct lineage.

They are usually included in the family Autostichidae.

Genera
This family contains about 10 genera:
 Arragonia Amsel, 1942
 Charadraula Meyrick, 1931
 Cyllaraxis Gozmány in Gaedike, 2000
 Gobiletria Gozmány, 1964
 Heringita Agenjo, 1953
 Hesperesta Gozmany, 1978
 Holcopogon Staudinger, 1880
 Oecia Walsingham, 1897
 Turatia Amsel, 1942

Former genera
 Bubulcellodes Amsel, 1942 (in Charadraula)
 Gigantoletria Gozmany, 1963 (in Heringita)
 Ilionarsis Gozmány, 1959 (in Turatia)

References

 See also Gelechioidea Talk page for comparison of some approaches to gelechioid systematics and taxonomy.

 
Autostichidae
Moth subfamilies